Dajan Hashemi (born 21 November 2000) is a Danish footballer who plays for Sassuolo in the Serie A and the Danish youth national teams.

Club career
Hashemi made her Elitedivisionen debut for BSF on 19 August 2017, and made her Damallsvenskan debut for Linköping on 13 October 2018. She is one of very few Danish footballers to play abroad before reaching the age of 18. She made her UEFA debut on 17 October 2018 in the 2018–19 UEFA Women's Champions League knockout phase against Paris Saint-Germain Féminines.

International career

Youth
Hashemi has represented Denmark at various youth levels, including the under-17 and under-19 teams. She made her UEFA debut for Denmark on 20 September 2016 with a goal against Slovakia in the 2017 UEFA  European Under-17 Championship qualification. Hashemi was one of the leading scorers of the 2018 UEFA European Under-19 Championship with two goals against the Netherlands. Her performances have drawn comparisons with fellow countrywoman Nadia Nadim.

Club statistics

References

External links

UEFA profile
DBU profile

2000 births
Living people
People from Helsingør Municipality
Danish women's footballers
Women's association football forwards
Linköpings FC players
Hammarby Fotboll (women) players
Ballerup-Skovlunde Fodbold (women) players
Damallsvenskan players
Danish people of Iranian descent
Sportspeople of Iranian descent
Danish expatriate women's footballers
Danish expatriate sportspeople in Sweden
Expatriate women's footballers in Sweden
FC Nordsjælland (women) players
Sportspeople from the Capital Region of Denmark

Association football forwards